"If You Think I'm Jiggy" is the first single released by rap group The Lox from their debut album, Money, Power & Respect. It was released on January 6, 1998 and was produced by Dame Grease. The single was a success, peaking at 30 on the Billboard Hot 100, 21 on the Hot R&B/Hip-Hop Songs and 9 on the Hot Rap Singles. The song interpolates Rod Stewart's "Do Ya Think I'm Sexy?".

Single track listing

A-Side
"If You Think I'm Jiggy" (Club Mix)- 3:47  
"If You Think I'm Jiggy" (Instrumental)- 3:46

B-Side
"If You Think I'm Jiggy" (Radio Edit)- 3:23  
"If You Think I'm Jiggy" (Instrumental)- 3:46

Charts

Peak positions

Year-End charts

References

1997 songs
1998 singles
The Lox songs
Bad Boy Records singles